Major-General Bernard Charles Gordon Lennox,  (19 September 1932 – 27 December 2017) was a senior British Army officer. He served as Commandant of the British Sector in Berlin from October 1983 to December 1985.

Military career
Born the eldest son of Lieutenant General Sir George Gordon Lennox, and educated at Eton College, Bernard Gordon Lennox was Page of Honour to King George VI. He graduated from the Royal Military Academy Sandhurst and was commissioned into the Grenadier Guards in 1953.

He was made Commanding Officer of 1st Bn Grenadier Guards in 1974. He went on to be a General Staff Officer at the RAF Staff College in 1976, Commander of 20th Armoured Brigade in 1978 and Chief of Staff for South East District in 1981 before becoming Commandant of the British Sector in Berlin in 1983. Finally he became the Senior Army Member at the Royal College of Defence Studies in 1986. He retired in 1987.

He lived at Eversley in Hampshire.

He died on 27 December 2017 at the age of 85.

Family
In 1958 he married Sally-Rose Warner: they went on to have three sons.

References

|-

 

1932 births
2017 deaths
People educated at Eton College
Companions of the Order of the Bath
Members of the Order of the British Empire
British Army major generals
Grenadier Guards officers
Graduates of the Royal Military Academy Sandhurst